Diana López (born 27 March 1993) is a Nicaraguan footballer who plays as a forward for UNAN Managua and the Nicaragua women's national team.

Club career
López has played for Leyendas FC, CD Águilas de León and UNAN Managua in Nicaragua.

International career
López made her senior debut for Nicaragua on 11 April 2021 in a 3–1 friendly away win over El Salvador.

References 

1993 births
Living people
Nicaraguan women's footballers
Women's association football forwards
Nicaragua women's international footballers